ITSO may refer to:

 ITSO Ltd, previously Integrated Transport Smartcard Organisation, who maintain the ITSO standard for smart ticketing in the UK
 International Telecommunications Satellite Organization, an intergovernmental consortium
 Information Technology Student Organization, a student organization at Rochester Institute of Technology
 International Technical Support Organization, the IBM group that produces IBM Redbooks.